Jose Perez "Joey" De Venecia III (born August 10, 1963) is a Filipino politician and entrepreneur. He is the eldest son of Jose de Venecia Jr., the Philippines' former five-term Speaker of Congress and Victoria Salazar Perez.  He received much attention in the Philippines as a whistleblower related to the corruption scandal surrounding the ZTE broadband project.

Joey finished his undergraduate accountancy degree at American University and his MBA, merit scholar, Fordham University.  He worked as an auditor for Arthur Anderson-based out of Washington, DC for over 4 years and for SGV & Co in the Philippines before obtaining his MBA.

Early life and career
De Venecia was born on August 10, 1963. His mother is Victoria Perez, the daughter of Eugenio Pérez, who served as Speaker of the House of Representatives from 1946 to 1953. He is the youngest of 4 children and his siblings are: Alexandra (Sandra), Leslie and Vivian. His parents' marriage ended in a divorce when Joey was six months old, and Perez now lives in Albany, New York.

Aside from being in telecommunications, he founded the first Third Party Contact Center in the Philippines in 1997 named Qinteraction. Since then, the Contact Center and Business Process Outsourcing Industry has created over 500,000 jobs as foreign investors have entered this market. We now have the likes of Accenture, Convergys, and Aegis PeopleSupport to name a few. The BPO Sector contributes about $USD 8bn to the Philippine Economy annually.

He was responsible for inviting and convincing the State Grid of China to participate in the privatization of our country's National Electricity Grid. Together with Goldman Sachs China, he participated in the preparation of the private sector bid and succeeded in the auction. This is the largest investment in the Philippine Energy Sector worth $USD 4bn.

Together with the Philippine Bank of Commerce, he established the National Bank of Equatorial Guinea in West Africa (Banco Nacional de Guinea Ecuatorial). Equatorial Guinea is a small country with less than a million people but has one of the largest proven oil reserves in the African Continent.

He is Chairman of Castle Rock Holdings Limited, a Hong Kong-registered financial advisory firm. He is on the advisory board of publicly listed firm, Basic Energy Corporation.

Personal life and education
De Venecia is married to Karen Batungbacal who graduated as a chemical engineer from University of Notre Dame, and had her master's degree in chemical engineering from Princeton University. Karen was formerly the managing director and Senior Country Operations Officer of JP Morgan Chase & Co. Currently the Executive General Manager of QBE's GSSC.

He graduated from the American University in Washington, D.C. where he earned a BS in Business Administration with a major in accounting. He was a full-time research scholar at the Fordham University Business School in New York City where he earned an MBA with a major in finance. He also taught accounting to first year MBA Students.

Civic work
From 2007 - 2008, he was Chairman of the Virlanie Foundation, a joint European and Philippine foundation that addresses the plight of street children in the country. Joey is also the Founder of CLICK (Computer sa Bawat Pamilya), a non-profit entity that advocates giving each Filipino family a computer.

Political career
De Venecia was the Secretary-General of PDP-Laban and currently a member of the Makati Business Club. He ran for senator at the 2010 Philippine general elections.

References

1963 births
Living people
21st-century Filipino businesspeople
Pwersa ng Masang Pilipino politicians
Fordham University alumni
American University alumni
PDP–Laban politicians
People from Manila
People from Dagupan